Rockland Historic District may refer to:
 Rockland Historic District (Rockland, Delaware), listed on the NRHP in Delaware
Rockland Residential Historic District, Rockland, ME, listed on the NRHP in Maine
 Rockland Historic District (Brooklandville, Maryland), listed on the NRHP in Maryland